Willis Linn Jepson (August 19, 1867 – November 7, 1946) was an early California botanist, conservationist, and writer.

Career 
Born at Little Oak Ranch near Vacaville, California, Jepson became interested in botany as a boy and explored the adjacent San Francisco Bay Area. He came in contact with various botanists before he entered college.

In 1892, at the age of 25, Jepson, John Muir, and Warren Olney formed the Sierra Club, in Olney's San Francisco law office. From 1895 to 1898, Jepson served as instructor in Botany and carried on research at the University of California, Berkeley, Cornell University (1895), and Harvard University (1896–1897). He received his Ph.D. at Berkeley in 1899.

He was made assistant professor in 1899, associate professor in 1911, professor in 1918, and professor emeritus in 1937. He was a Professor of Botany at UC Berkeley for four decades, thus his entire career was identified with the University of California. Jepson founded the California Botanical Society and served as its president from 1913 to 1915; he also worked as councilor of the Rancho Santa Ana Botanic Garden.

Legacy 
Many honors and commemorations came to Jepson during his lifetime and as well as posthumously:
 He was granted a fellowship to the California Academy of Sciences, American Academy of Arts and Sciences, and American Geographical Society
 Member of the American Genetic Association, American Society of Plant Taxonomists, Botanical Society of America, Society of American Foresters, Washington Academy of Sciences, Western Society of Naturalists, Phi Beta Kappa, and Sigma Xi
 Foreign member of the Royal Society of Arts, Société linnéenne de Lyon, and Czechoslovak Botanical Society
 Colleagues at UC Berkeley honored him with the Faculty Research Lectureship in 1934
 The Saxifragaceae genus Jepsonia and its species are named after him
 The Jepson Herbarium at UC Berkeley is named for him
 The Jepson Manual is named in his honor
 California's Jepson Peak, Mount Jepson, and Jepson Prairie are named after him
 The oldest known living laurel tree in California is named after him.

Publications 
Jepson wrote at least 11 books during his lifetime, with two focused on California's trees. His works include A Flora of California (1909), The Trees of California (1909); and the major A Manual of the Flowering Plants of California (1925), predecessor of The Jepson Manual (1993).

References

Footnotes

Bibliography

External links 

 
 
 

19th-century American botanists
19th-century American male writers
19th-century American non-fiction writers
20th-century American botanists
20th-century American male writers
20th-century American non-fiction writers
1867 births
1946 deaths
Activists from California
American botanical writers
American conservationists
American information and reference writers
American male non-fiction writers
American non-fiction environmental writers
American taxonomists
Botanists active in California
Botanists active in North America
Cornell University faculty
Harvard University staff
People from Vacaville, California
Scientists from the San Francisco Bay Area
Sierra Club people
University of California, Berkeley alumni
University of California, Berkeley faculty